The Venellī or Unellī (Gaulish: *Uenellī/Wenellī) were a Gallic tribe dwelling on the Cotentin peninsula, in the northwest of modern Normandy, during the Iron Age and the Roman period.

In 57 BC, they capitulated to Caesar's legate Publius Licinius Crassus, but rebelled the following year and sent troops to help the Gallic coalition against Rome during the Battle of Alesia (52 BC).

Name 
They are mentioned as V[e]nellos by Caesar (mid-1st c. BC), Venelli by Pliny (1st c. AD), Oủenéllōn (Οủενέλλων, var. Οủενeλῶν) and Oủénelloi (Οủένελλοι, var. Οủένελοι) by Ptolemy (2nd c. AD), and as Oủenellous (Οủενελλους) by Cassius Dio (3rd c. AD).

The etymology of the ethnonym is obscure. It may stem from the Celtic root  ('clan, family, lineage').

Geography 

During the Roman period, their chief town became Crociatonum (modern Carentan). It was given the name of Constantia in 298 AD during the reign of Roman emperor Constantius Chlorus. The surrounding region, called in Latin the pagus Constantinus subsequently became known as the Cotentin Peninsula.

History 
Caesar mentions them with the Veneti, Osismi, Curiosolitae, and other maritime states. The Unelli and the rest submitted to Publius Licinius Crassus in 57 BC; but in 56 BC it was necessary to send a force again into the country of the Unelli, Curiosolitae, and Lexovii. Quintus Titurius Sabinus had the command of the three legions who were to keep the Unelli and their neighbours quiet. The commander of the Unelli was Viridovix, and he was also at the head of all the forces of the states which had joined the Unelli, among whom were the Aulerci Eburovices and the Lexovii. The force of Viridovix was very large, and he was joined by desperate men from all parts of Gallia, robbers and those who were 'too idle to till the ground'. The Roman general entrenched himself in his camp, and made the Galli believe that he was afraid and was intending to slip away by night. The trick deceived the Galli, and they attacked the Roman camp, which was well placed on an eminence with a sloping ascent to it about a mile (1.6 km) in length. On the Galli reaching the Roman camp exhausted by a rapid march up the hill and encumbered with the fascines which they carried for filling up the ditch, the Romans sallied out by two gates and punished the enemy well for their temerity. They slaughtered an immense number of the Galli, and the cavalry pursuing the remainder let few escape. This feat of arms is told clearly in the Commentaries.

The Unelli sent a contingent of 6000 men to attack Caesar at the siege of Alesia in 52 BC. (B. G. vii. 75.)

References

Bibliography 

Historical Celtic peoples
Gauls
Tribes of pre-Roman Gaul
Tribes involved in the Gallic Wars
History of Normandy